Alain Fabien Maurice Marcel Delon (born 8 November 1935) is a French actor and filmmaker. He was one of Europe's most prominent actors and screen sex symbols in the 1960s, 1970s and 1980s. In 1985, he won the César Award for Best Actor for his performance in Notre histoire (1984). In 1991, he received France's Legion of Honour. At the 45th Berlin International Film Festival, he won the Honorary Golden Bear. At the 2019 Cannes Film Festival, he received the Honorary Palme d'Or.

Delon achieved critical acclaim for roles in films Purple Noon (1960), Rocco and His Brothers (1960), L'Eclisse (1962), The Leopard (1963), Le Samouraï (1967), La Piscine (1969), Le Cercle Rouge (1970), Un flic (1972), and Monsieur Klein (1976). Over the course of his career Delon worked with many directors, including Luchino Visconti, Jean-Luc Godard, Jean-Pierre Melville, Michelangelo Antonioni, and Louis Malle. As a singer, Delon recorded the popular duet "Paroles, paroles" (1973) with Dalida. He acquired Swiss citizenship in 1999.

Early life 
Alain Delon was born in Sceaux, Seine (now Hauts-de-Seine), Île-de-France, a wealthy suburb of Paris. His parents, Édith (née Arnold; 1911–1995) and Fabien Delon (1904–1977), divorced when Delon was four. Both remarried and, as a result, Delon has a half-sister and two half-brothers. His paternal grandmother was Corsican, from Prunelli-di-Fiumorbo. When his parents divorced, Delon was sent to live with foster parents; after the foster parents died, Delon's parents took shared custody of him, but the arrangement proved unsatisfactory. He attended a Catholic boarding school, the first of several schools from which he was expelled because of unruly behavior. Delon left school at 14 and worked for a brief time at his stepfather's butcher shop. He enlisted in the French Navy three years later, aged 17, and during 1953–1954 he served as a fusilier marin in the First Indochina War.

Early career 
In 1949, Delon starred in Le rapt, a short film in which he portrayed a gangster involved in a kidnapping.

In 1956, after his naval service, Delon returned to France, and spent time working as a waiter, a porter, a secretary, and a sales assistant. During this time, he became friends with the actress Brigitte Auber￼ and joined her on a trip to the Cannes Film Festival, where his film career would begin.

First film roles 
At Cannes, Delon was seen by a talent scout for David O. Selznick. After a screen test Selznick offered him a contract, provided he learn English. Delon returned to Paris to study the language, but when he met French director Yves Allégret, he was convinced that he should stay in France to begin his career. Selznick allowed Delon to cancel his contract, and Allégret gave him his debut in the film with Edwige Feuillère, Quand la femme s'en mêle (1957) (Send a Woman When the Devil Fails). Marc Allégret cast him in Be Beautiful But Shut Up (1958), which featured a young Jean-Paul Belmondo. He was then given his first lead, supporting Romy Schneider in the period romance Christine (1958), based on a novel by Arthur Schnitzler. He and Schneider began a highly publicized romance in real life. The film was the seventeenth most popular movie at the French box office that year.

French stardom 

Delon was given the lead in the comedy Women Are Weak (1959). This was a big hit in France and was the first of Delon's films to be seen in America. Delon made some personal appearances in New York to promote the movie.

International fame 
Delon next made two films that ensured his international reputation. In 1960, he appeared in René Clément's Plein Soleil, released in the US as Purple Noon, which was based on the Patricia Highsmith novel The Talented Mr. Ripley. Delon played protagonist Tom Ripley to critical acclaim; Highsmith was a fan of his portrayal. The movie was a hit in France and on the art house circuit in English-speaking countries. He then played the title role in Luchino Visconti's Rocco and His Brothers (1960). Critic Bosley Crowther of The New York Times wrote that Delon's work was "touchingly pliant and expressive".

Delon made his stage debut in 1961 in the John Ford play 'Tis Pity She's a Whore alongside Romy Schneider in Paris. Visconti directed the production which broke box office records. He was reunited with René Clément in the Italian comedy film about fascism, The Joy of Living (1961). It was a minor success. More popular was an all-star anthology film Famous Love Affairs (1961); Delon's segment cast him as Albert III, Duke of Bavaria, opposite Brigitte Bardot. Around this time Delon was mentioned as a possibility for the lead in Lawrence of Arabia. Peter O'Toole was cast instead, but then Delon was signed by Seven Arts to a four-picture deal, including a big budget international movie of the Marco Polo story and The King of Paris, about Alexandre Dumas. Neither project came to fruition. Instead he was cast by Michelangelo Antonioni opposite Monica Vitti in L'Eclisse (1962), a major critical success, although audiences were small. More popular was another all-star anthology film, The Devil and the Ten Commandments (1963); Delon's segment cast him with Danielle Darrieux.

MGM 

Producer Jacques Bar was making a heist film with Jean Gabin with backing from MGM, titled Any Number Can Win (1963). Gabin's co-star was meant to be Jean-Louis Trintignant until Delon lobbied Bar for the role. He took the film's distribution rights in certain countries instead of a straight salary. Because this had never been done before in France, this was known as "Delon's method." The gamble paid off well, with Jean Gabin later claiming that Delon earned 10 times more money than he did as a result. However, in 1965, Delon claimed "no one else has tried it since and made money." Nonetheless, the experience gave Delon a taste for producing. He also signed a five-picture deal with MGM, of which Any Number Can Win was the first. His reputation was further enhanced when he worked with Visconti again for Il Gattopardo (The Leopard) with Burt Lancaster and Claudia Cardinale. This was the seventh biggest hit of the year in France; Any Number Can Win was the sixth. The Leopard was also widely screened in the U.S. through 20th Century Fox. Delon was now one of the most popular stars in France. He starred in a swashbuckler, The Black Tulip (1964), another hit. Les Félins (1964), which reunited him with Rene Clement and co-starred Jane Fonda, was filmed in French and English versions. The latter was distributed by MGM, but it was not a success. In 1964, the Cinémathèque Française held a showcase of Delon's films and Delon started a production company, Delbeau Production, with Georges Beaume. They produced a film called The Unvanquished (L'insoumis) (1964), where Delon played a terrorist OAS assassin. It had to be re-edited because of legal issues. Despite being distributed by MGM, audiences were small.

Hollywood star 
Typecast as a "Latin Lover", Delon spent the next few years focused on Hollywood and said in 1965 that he wanted to make a picture in America and one in Europe each year. He also said that his accent prevented him from playing certain roles: "Because of my accent, I would not attempt to play Americans. I am working on removing the distinctly French inflections from my speech so that I can play all continental nationalities."

He started with a small part in an all-star anthology for MGM titled The Yellow Rolls-Royce (1965), opposite Shirley MacLaine. It was popular although Delon had little to do. He had his first English-language lead in Once a Thief, where he co-starred with Ann-Margret. It was based on a novel by Zekial Marko who had written Any Number Can Win, but it was not as successful. It was financed by MGM, which announced Delon would appear in a Western Ready for the Tiger directed by Sam Peckinpah, but the film was never made. Instead, Delon signed a three-picture deal with Columbia, for whom he appeared in the big budget action film Lost Command (1966), playing a member of the French Foreign Legion, alongside Anthony Quinn and Claudia Cardinale. The studio also announced that he would appear in the biopic Cervantes, but this was never made. Universal Studios used Delon in a Western, Texas Across the River, opposite Dean Martin. Ray Stark wanted to use him in The Night of the Iguana and This Property Is Condemned. He did not appear in either film but was in that producer's Is Paris Burning?, directed by René Clément, playing Jacques Chaban-Delmas. This was a massive hit in France but performed disappointingly at the US box office – as did all of Delon's Hollywood-financed films. Delon remained a massive star in France, along with Steve McQueen and Sean Connery, and was also one of the biggest foreign stars in Japan. However, he could not make headway into the U.S market.

Return to France 

After six Hollywood movies Delon returned to France to make The Last Adventure opposite Lino Ventura. It was one of Delon's most popular films of the 1960s but was not popular in North America. He was meant to work again with Visconti in The Stranger but did not end up playing it. Instead, he appeared on stage in Paris, Les Yeux Creves and made Le Samouraï with Jean-Pierre Melville, which became another classic. He played an amnesiac in Diabolically Yours (1968) for Julien Duvivier and had a role in another all-star anthology, Spirits of the Dead (1968); his segment was directed by Louis Malle, and co-starred Brigitte Bardot. Delon had another attempt at English-language cinema with The Girl on a Motorcycle (1968) with Marianne Faithfull for director Jack Cardiff. It was a surprise hit in Britain. Far more popular at the French box office was Farewell Friend (Adieu l'ami), where Delon and Charles Bronson played former foreign legionnaires who get involved in a heist. The film helped turn Charles Bronson into a genuine star in Europe.

Marković affair and gangster movies 

While making the 1969 thriller La Piscine (The Swimming Pool) with Romy Schneider, Delon's friend and bodyguard Stevan Marković was found murdered in a rubbish dump near Paris. The police investigation revealed claims of sex parties involving celebrities such as Delon and members of the French government including future president Georges Pompidou, whose wife, Claude Pompidou, was allegedly the subject of a series of compromising photos at one such party. Corsican crime boss François Marcantoni, a friend of Delon, was suspected of involvement in the murder. The affair gained notoriety throughout France and in the French press as the "Marković affair". In a 1969 BBC interview, Delon was questioned about his alleged involvement in the death of Marković, rumors of his involvement in the sex parties, and Delon's own sexual preferences.

Delon then starred in a series of gangster films. The first was Jeff (1969), made by his own production company, Adel. In The Sicilian Clan (1969) Delon collaborated with Lino Ventura and Jean Gabin, and the film was a blockbuster. Even more popular in Europe was Borsalino (1970), which Delon produced and in which he co-starred opposite Jean-Paul Belmondo. Yet, neither of these films was successful in the US, as Delon had hoped. Neither was The Red Circle, despite Delon co-starring in it with Yves Montand. For a change of pace, he produced a romantic drama, The Love Mates (1971), which also was not successful. 
Neither was the comedy Easy, Down There! (1971).

More international films 
In the early 1970s, Delon made another attempt at the English-speaking market. The Assassination of Trotsky (1972) for Joseph Losey was poorly received but Red Sun (1972), with Charles Bronson and Toshiro Mifune, did well. In France he appeared opposite Simone Signoret in The Widow Couderc (1971). He made his third film with Melville, Un flic (1972). He produced and starred in a romantic drama, Indian Summer (1972), then made some thrillers: Traitement de choc (1973), and Tony Arzenta (1973). In 1973, he recorded a duet with Dalida, "Paroles, paroles", that went on to become one of the most recognizable French songs. He tried again for Hollywood stardom with Scorpio (1973), with Burt Lancaster for director Michael Winner. It was only a minor hit. In France, he made The Burned Barns (1973) and Creezy (1974). He produced Two Men in Town (1974) which re-teamed him with Jean Gabin, and Borsalino & Co. (1974), a sequel to his earlier hit. After another gangster thriller, Icy Breasts (1974), Delon returned to his first swashbuckler since The Black Tulip, playing the title character in the 1975 Italian-French film Zorro. He made some more crime filmes: The Gypsy (1975), Flic Story (1975) (with Jean Louis Triginant), Boomerang (1976) and Armaguedon (1976). In 1976, Delon starred in Monsieur Klein, for which he was nominated for the César Award.

It was back to crime for another series of thrillers in which he starred as well as produced: Man in a Hurry (1977), Death of a Corrupt Man (1977), Le Gang (1977), Attention, The Kids Are Watching (1978). In 1979, Delon stated only a quarter of his business activities involve films, that he also has "a helicopter business, build furniture, promote prize fights, and race horses", and that he was still interested in becoming a star in America. In 1979 he made a final attempt at Hollywood stardom, signing with agent Sue Mengers and starring in The Concorde ... Airport '79 (1979). The film was not a big success. Delon returned to French films which he produced: The Medic (1979) and Three Men to Kill (1980).

Later career

1980s and 1990s 
Teheran 43 (1981) was a change of pace. In this big Soviet production he co-starred with Claude Jade and Curd Jürgens in a co-starring role beside Russian actors. Then it was back to crime: For a Cop's Hide (1981), Le choc (1982), Le Battant (1983). He was awarded the Best Actor César Award for his role in Bertrand Blier's Notre histoire (1984), and portrayed the aristocratic dandy Baron de Charlus in a film adaptation of Marcel Proust's novel Swann in Love in the same year. The thrillers resumed: Parole de flic (1986), The Passage, Let Sleeping Cops Lie (1988), and Dancing Machine (1990). One notable film during this time was Jean-Luc Godard's Nouvelle Vague in 1990, in which Delon played twins. Delon's last major role was in Patrice Leconte's Une chance sur deux in 1998, another box office disappointment. Delon announced his decision to give up acting in 1997, although he still occasionally accepts roles.

Delon acquired Swiss citizenship on 23 September 1999, and the company managing products sold under his name is based in Geneva. He resides in Chêne-Bougeries in the canton of Geneva.

2000s and 2010s 
In 2001, Delon starred in the French television drama Fabio Montale. He played an ageing policeman dressed in stylish clothes, a "signature Delon" role for audiences. The show was a big hit. In 2003, Delon tried to recreate the success of Fabio Montale and produced and starred in another French television police drama, Frank Riva. It did well but less so than Fabio Montale. He starred, in 2008, as Jules Cesar in the box-office hit Asterix aux jeux Olympiques which co-starred Gérard Depardieu. Around this time he mostly took roles in TV movies and also played some roles on the French stage. He directed a TV movie himself in 2008 co-starring Anouk Aimee, titled Love Letters based on a play by A.R. Gurney. In 2018, after a seven-year hiatus from cinema, Delon was planning to star in a new movie, titled La Maison Vide, co-starring Juliette Binoche and directed by Patrice Leconte. However, in November 2018 the French media announced that the project was canceled. No specific reason was given for the cancelation. His last roles to date have been in the 2011 television movie Une journée ordinaire, in the 2012 Russian production S Novym godom, Mamy! in which he starred as himself and he again appeared as himself in the 2019 movie Toute Ressemblance as a guest in a talkshow.

In April 2019, at 83, Delon released a new single. The track, titled Je n'aime que toi, was composed by Rick Allison and Julia Paris. Already in 1973 Delon scored a huge international hit duetting with Egyptian-French singer Dalida on the song Paroles...paroles. In 1983 he collaborated with Shirley Bassey on the international hit song Thought I'd ring you.

At the 2019 Cannes Film Festival, which was held from 14 to 25 May, Delon was the recipient of an honorary Palme d'Or for his long standing career in the movies. A retrospective of some of his films played at the festival. There was much controversy surrounding Delon receiving this award because of the presumed remarks he had made concerning the treatment of women during his career and in his private life. Thierry Fremaux, the artistic director of the festival, told the Cannes audience during a homage at the ceremony, "We know that intolerance is back, we're being asked to believe that if we all think the same it will protect us from the risk of being disliked or being wrong, but Alain Delon is not afraid of being wrong, being disliked, and he doesn't think like others, and he's not afraid of being alone". "For me, it's more than the end of a career. It's the end of a life. It feels that I'm receiving a posthumous tribute while being alive," said Delon. He received the award from his daughter Anouchka Delon.

2020s 

In a July 2021 interview on TV5Monde, his first since having two strokes, Delon said that he plans to act in one more film.Also on TV5Monde, Delon interviewed Ukrainian president Zelenskyy in September 2022 as part of a special programme on the situation in Ukraine, Face à Zelensky. Delon expressed his support for the Ukrainian people during the interview.

Business career 
In the 1970s, Delon expanded his commercial interests, buying harness racing trotters and promoting boxing matches. He has also helped develop and promote a variety of products sold under his name including wristwatches, clothing, eyewear, perfume, stationery, and cigarettes. Delon's brand of sunglasses became particularly popular in Hong Kong after actor Chow Yun-fat wore them in the 1986 crime film A Better Tomorrow (as well as two sequels). Delon reportedly wrote a letter thanking Chow for helping to promote and sell the sunglasses in Hong Kong and China. The film's director John Woo has acknowledged Delon as one of his idols and wrote a short essay on Le Samourai as well as Le Cercle Rouge for the Criterion Collection DVD releases. In 2009 and 2015, Christian Dior used images of the young Alain Delon and excerpts of his 1960s films The Swimming Pool and The Last Adventure respectively in the Eau Sauvage cologne advertising campaigns.

Personal life 

On 20 March 1959, Delon was engaged to actress Romy Schneider, whom he met when they co-starred in the film Christine (1958). During their relationship, he had an affair with German actress, singer and model Nico. In 1962, Nico gave birth to a son, Christian Aaron Boulogne (Ari Päffgen) "Ari", but Delon never recognized the child as his; Ari was raised mostly by Delon's parents. In 1964, Delon and Schneider broke up. After Romy's death in 1982, he confessed that Romy Schneider was the love of his life.

In 1963, Delon met young divorcée Francine Canovas (a model known professionally as Nathalie Barthélémy). In January 1964, Barthélémy became pregnant by Delon. On August 13, 1964, they married, and she took the name Nathalie Delon. Their son Anthony Delon, her second child, was born on 30 September 1964. In 1967, Alain Delon filed for divorce. The couple divorced on 14 February 1969.

In the mid-1960s, Delon had a short relationship with Dalida; the two had been friends since first meeting in Paris in 1955, where they were neighbors in the same building on the Champs-Élysées.

In August 1968, during the shooting of the film La piscine, Delon met French actress Mireille Darc and asked her to shoot a movie together. They started a relationship that lasted until 1982. He later had short relationships with actress Anne Parillaud and Catherine Bleynie, ex-wife of Didier Pironi.

Delon was in a short relationship with Guadeloupe-born dancer and actress Maddly Bamy. He met Bamy on the set of La Piscine, where Bamy had a small role. As Delon was also Mireille Darc's partner at the time, he shared his life with two women. Bamy ended their relationship in 1971, and thus became Jacques Brel's last companion. Their love triangle served as an inspiration to the 1969 film The Love Mates, in which Delon and Darc starred. Darc also wrote the film's screenplay under her real name, Mireille Aigroz.

In 1987, Delon met Dutch model  on the set of the music video for his song "Comme au cinéma" and started a relationship. They had two children: Anouchka Delon (25 November 1990) and Alain-Fabien Delon (18 March 1994). The relationship ended in 2001.

Delon lives in Chêne-Bougeries in the Canton of Geneva, Switzerland, and Douchy, Loiret, France.

During an interview in 2013, Delon expressed support of the French far-right political party National Front, saying "The National Front, like the MCG [Geneva Citizens' Movement] in Geneva, is very important... I encourage it and I perfectly understand it". Delon was good friends with Argentine world champion boxer Carlos Monzon.

In September 2019, Christian Aaron "Ari" Boulogne sued Alain Delon for recognition of paternity.

In 2022, the 86 year-old Delon was invited by Volodymyr Zelenskyy to travel to Ukraine.

Marković affair 

On 1 October 1968, in the village of Élancourt, Yvelines, on the western outskirts of Paris, the body of Stevan Marković, Delon's former ex-bodyguard, was found in a public dump. Delon and a Corsican gangster François Marcantoni came under investigation. One of the factors pointing in that direction was a letter from Marković to his brother Aleksandar, in which he wrote: "If I get killed, it's 100% the fault of Alain Delon and his godfather Francois Marcantoni." Later, the investigation involved the former French Prime Minister (and later President) Georges Pompidou after a few press articles and a testimony of Borivoj Ackov. He testified that he was present at parties with Pompidou's wife, Marković, and Delon.

Marković's death sparked rumours suggesting the existence of group sex photos with Pompidou's wife. Pompidou accused Louis Wallon and Henri Capitant of using the French espionage service SDECE with an aim to set him up. After becoming President of the Republic, he named Alexandre de Marenches as the head of the SDECE in order to reform it. Assisted by Michel Roussin, his principal private secretary, de Marenches expelled a "secret agent" involved in the investigation of Jean-Charles Marchiani.

Other legal troubles 
In 1969, Delon was convicted in absentia and sentenced to four months in jail by an Italian court for assaulting an Italian photographer.

De Gaulle document 
In 1970, Delon, through a friend, Mr Stan, purchased a copy of the original manuscript of Charles de Gaulle's 1940 speech to the French encouraging them to resist the Germans. Delon paid 300,000 francs for the manuscript and then returned it to the government.

Health 
Delon suffered a stroke in June 2019. He was admitted to hospital after experiencing dizziness and headaches. In August 2019, he was recovering in a Swiss hospital.

In a 2021 interview with Paris Match, Delon expressed support for euthanasia, calling it "the most logical and natural thing." In 2022, Delon's son Anthony revealed in his autobiography Entre chien et loup that, following the death of his mother Nathalie, Alain said he wanted to be removed from life support if he were to succumb to a coma, and had asked Anthony to fulfill his request if such a circumstance arose. Shortly thereafter, some news organizations reported that Delon was planning to imminently end his life through euthanasia. But the reports were adamantly denied by his son, Alain-Fabien, who said that quotes from Anthony Delon's book had been taken out of context.

Influences 
Delon's favourite actor is John Garfield. He also admires Montgomery Clift, Marlon Brando and Robert Walker.

Honours 
 At the 2019 Cannes Film Festival, he received the Honorary Palme d'Or.
 At the 45th Berlin International Film Festival, he won the Honorary Golden Bear.
 Delon appears on the cover of the 1986 album The Queen Is Dead by The Smiths.
 He was made Officier (Officer) of the Ordre national du Mérite in 1995.
 He was made Chevalier (Knight) of the Légion d'honneur on 21 February 1991. He was promoted to Officier (Officer) in 2005.
 The song "Beautiful Killer" on Madonna's twelfth studio album MDNA is a tribute to Delon.
 The song "A Look From The Screen" by Russian band Nautilus Pompilius is a tribute to Delon.

Filmography 

Delon's most acclaimed films, according to the review aggregate site Rotten Tomatoes, include Purple Noon (1960), Rocco and His Brothers (1960), L'Eclisse (1962), The Leopard (1963), Le Samouraï (1967), The Swimming Pool (1969), Le Cercle Rouge (1970), and Monsieur Klein (1976).

See also 
 List of French actors
 List of animal rights advocates
 List of Swiss people

References

External links 

 
 "The perils of trans-national stardom: Alain Delon in Hollywood cinema" by Ginette Vincendeau

 
1935 births
20th-century French male actors
20th-century French people
21st-century French male actors
21st-century Swiss people
Best Actor César Award winners
Honorary Golden Bear recipients
French emigrants to Switzerland
French male film actors
French male stage actors
French male television actors
French racehorse owners and breeders
French military personnel of the First Indochina War
French people of Corsican descent
Illeists
Living people
Naturalised citizens of Switzerland
Officiers of the Légion d'honneur
Officers of the Ordre national du Mérite
People from Sceaux, Hauts-de-Seine
Sportspeople from Hauts-de-Seine
Alain